The Party for the Restoration of Malian Values (PRVM) is a political party in Mali led by Mamadou Sidibe.

History
The party was officially registered on 20 March 2013. In the 2013 parliamentary elections it won a single seat.

References

Political parties in Mali
Political parties established in 2013